Ilse Albert (born 23 April 1929) is an Austrian former swimmer. She competed in the women's 200 metre breaststroke at the 1952 Summer Olympics, where she was eliminated in the preliminary heats. She was one of three swimmers representing Austria at the 1952 Summer Olympics, and the only woman.

References

External links
 

1929 births
Possibly living people
Olympic swimmers of Austria
Swimmers at the 1952 Summer Olympics
Place of birth missing (living people)
Austrian female breaststroke swimmers